The Army Music Command is an organization under the direct authority of the Chief of Staff of the French Army. It is based in Satory.

It consists of a headquarters, 5 wind bands, a brass band and a string ensemble - the only one in the Armed Forces, distributed throughout French territory in the following cities: Lille, Lyon, Metz, Toulouse, Rennes and Versailles.

These 6 bands include the following:

Marine Band (Versailles)
Artillery Band (Lyon)
Signals Band (Rennes)
Infantry Band (Lille)
Cavalry and Armored Branch Band (Metz)
Parachute Band (Toulouse)

These bands exclude the bands of unit regiments and military schools. It supports missions aimed at promoting music in military institutions but also in civil society. French army bands recruit from high-level professional instrumentalists. It trains musicians for the various army bands as well as musical conductors not just for the branches of the armed forces but also for armies of foreign countries.

History
Its origins date back to the creation, in 1792, of the Guard School of Music, the purpose of which was to train musicians for battle. In 1795, one of the emanations was the National Conservatory of Music for civilian musicians only. In 1836, the Guard School of Music became the Military Gymnasium, then, in 1965, a training and further training center for Army NCOs. In 1978, the Military Conservatory of Army Music was created to train and perfect the musical excellence of all of the Army's military musicians.

Other army bands
Outside of this framework, army bands include the following bands:

Fanfare du 27e Bataillon de Chasseurs Alpin
Paris Fire Brigade Band
French Foreign Legion Music Band (MLE)
Fanfare du 9e Brigade d'Infanterie de Marine
Fanfare du 6e Régiment du Génie
Fanfare de 1er régiment de chasseurs à cheval
Fanfare du 1er Régiment De Hussards Parachutistes
Fanfare du 2e Régiment De Hussards
Fanfare du 503e régiment du Train
Fanfare du 92 Régiment d'infanterie
Fanfare du 1er régiment de spahis
Fanfare Nouba du 1er Régiment de Tirailleurs
Fanfare du Régiment de Marche du Tchad
Fanfare du 1er Régiment Parachutiste d' Infanterie de Marine
Fanfare des Ecoles Militaires de Draguignan (School of Applied Artillery)

Fanfare bands of military lyceums (lycee militaire) are also operated in the following cities: Autun, La Flèche, Saint-Cyr-l'École, and Aix-en-Provence.

See also
Royal Corps of Army Music
Australian Army Band Corps

References

French military bands
Military units and formations established in 1792
Military units and formations of France